Qualification for 2015 Japan Super Series will be held on 8 September 2015.

Men's Single

Seeds

Qualifying draw

First qualifier

Second qualifier

Third qualifier

Fourth qualifier

Women's Single

Seeds

Qualifying draw

First qualifier

Second qualifier

Third qualifier

Fourth qualifier

Men's doubles

Seeds

Qualifying draw

First qualifier

Second qualifier

Third qualifier

Fourth qualifier

Women's doubles

Seeds

Qualifying draw

First qualifier

Second qualifier

Third qualifier

Fourth qualifier

Mixed doubles

Seeds

Qualifying draw

First qualifier

Second qualifier

Third qualifier

Fourth qualifier

References
Original Draw Results (14 August 2015)
MS – Qualification Results
WS – Qualification Results
MD – Qualification Results
WD – Qualification Results
XD – Qualification Results

2015 BWF Super Series
Japan Super Series